Brompton or The Brompton may refer to:
 Brompton, London
 Brompton, Hambleton, north of Northallerton, North Yorkshire, England
 Brompton, Kent
 Brompton, Quebec, a borough of Sherbrooke, in Canada
 Brompton, Scarborough, North Yorkshire, England (also known as Brompton-by-Sawdon)
 Brompton, Shropshire
 Brompton, South Australia, a suburb in Adelaide, South Australia
 Brompton-on-Swale, North Yorkshire, England
 Brompton Oratory, a Catholic church
 Brompton Bicycle
 Holy Trinity Brompton Church, an Anglican church
 Royal Brompton Hospital
 Brompton cocktail, sometimes called Brompton mixture, an elixir for pain prophylaxis
 West Brompton, London
 Brompton Cemetery, London
 Brompton (surname)
 Brompton (Fredericksburg, Virginia), an historic house
 New Brompton F.C., the original name of Gillingham F.C., which the club used until 1912